David Montagu Erskine, 2nd Baron Erskine (12 August 1776 – 19 March 1855) was a British diplomat and politician.

Background and education
A member of Clan Erskine, Erskine was the eldest son of Thomas Erskine, 1st Baron Erskine, fourth son of Henry Erskine, 10th Earl of Buchan. His mother was Frances, daughter of Daniel Moore. He was educated at Winchester and Trinity College, Cambridge, matriculating in 1796. He was called to the Bar of Lincoln's Inn in 1802.

Political and diplomatic career
Erskine did not practise law; instead he was elected as Member of Parliament for Portsmouth in 1806, in place of his father, who was appointed Lord Chancellor. At the request of Erskine's father to Charles James Fox, then Foreign Secretary, he was appointed Minister to the United States later that year.

In 1809, Erskine was recalled by the Foreign Secretary, George Canning, for having offered the withdrawal of the Orders in Council of 1807 against the Americans and his resolution of the Chesapeake-Leopard Affair. He thus remained out of favour and unemployed until 1824, when he inherited his father's title and was appointed Minister to Stuttgart. He subsequently transferred to Munich in 1828. He retired in 1843.

British historian Paul Langford looks at the decisions by the British government in 1809:

Family

Lord Erskine had lived in the United States prior to his appointment as Minister to Washington. In 1799, he married as his first wife Frances Cadwalader, daughter of John Cadwalader, a general during the American Revolutionary War. She was the great granddaughter of Judge William Moore, of Moore's Hall, Pennsylvania, whose niece married Lord Erskine's father, and hence Lord Erskine and his wife were cousins. A portrait of Lady Erskine was considered one of Gilbert Stuart's masterpieces. They had twelve children:

Thomas Americus Erskine, later 3rd Baron Erskine (1802–1877), diplomat.
John Cadwallader Erskine, later 4th Baron Erskine (1804–1882), diplomat.
Steuarta Erskine (1810–1863), married Timothy Yeats Brown.
Elizabeth Erskine (c. 1812–1886), married Sir St Vincent Hawkins-Whitshed, 2nd Baronet.
Lt.-Col. David Montagu Erskine (1816–1903), soldier.
Edward Morris Erskine (1817–1883), diplomat.
James Stuart Erskine (1821–1904), created Graf Erskine by Ludwig II of Bavaria.
Frances Erskine (died 1876), married Gabriel Shawe.
Sevilla Erskine (died 1835), married Sir Henry Howard.
Harriett Erskine (died 1855), married Charles Woodmass.
Jane Plumer Erskine (died 1846), married James Callander of Craigforth and Ardkinglas.
Mary Erskine (died 1874), married Graf Hermann von Paumgarten; their great-grandson, Graf Karl Theodor zu Törring-Jettenbach, married Princess Elizabeth of Greece and Denmark.

Thomas Americus was named after Thomas Cadwalader, Lady Erskine's brother, who became an officer during the War of 1812. John Cadwallader was named after her father. Lady Erskine died in Genoa in March 1843.

Erskine married as his second wife Anne, daughter of John Travis, in July 1843. After Anne's death in April 1851, he married as his third wife Anna, daughter of William Cunninghame Graham of Gartmore and Finlaystone and widow of Thomas Calderwood Durham, in 1852. There were no children from his second and third marriage. Lord Erskine died at his home of Butler's Green in Sussex in March 1855, aged 78, and was buried at Cuckfield. He was succeeded in the barony by his eldest son, Thomas. His widow married the Venerable John Sandford, Archdeacon of Coventry, in 1856. She died on 26 March 1886.

Notes

References
H. M. Stephens, 'Erskine, David Montagu, second Baron Erskine (1776–1855)', rev. H. C. G. Matthew, Oxford Dictionary of National Biography, Oxford University Press, 2004, accessed 15 Nov 2007

1776 births
1855 deaths
Alumni of Trinity College, Cambridge
Barons in the Peerage of the United Kingdom
Diplomatic peers
Members of the Parliament of the United Kingdom for English constituencies
UK MPs 1802–1806
UK MPs who inherited peerages
People educated at Winchester College
David
Eldest sons of British hereditary barons
Ambassadors of the United Kingdom to the United States